Ecpyrrhorrhoe ruidispinalis is a moth in the family Crambidae. It was described by Zhang, Li and Wang in 2004. It is found in China (Guanxi).

References

Moths described in 2004
Pyraustinae